Koponen is a Finnish surname. Notable people with the surname include:

 Kuikka-Koponen (1833–1890), Finnish illusionist and magician
 Albin Koponen (1881–1944), Finnish sheet metal worker and politician
 Aulis Koponen (1906–1978), Finnish international footballer
 Niilo Koponen (1928–2013), American education and politician
 Timo Koponen (born 1942), Finnish diplomat
 Hannu Koponen (born 1959), Finnish ski-orienteering competitor
 Ari Koponen (born 1982), Finnish politician
 Ari Koponen (speedway rider) (1959–2018), Finnish speedway rider
 Noora Koponen (born 1983), Finnish politician
 Ville-Matti Koponen (born 1984), Finnish professional ice hockey forward
 Marlo Koponen (born 1986), Finnish ice hockey defenceman
 Petteri Koponen (born 1988), Finnish professional basketball player
 Suvi Koponen (born 1988), Finnish fashion model
 Jere Koponen (born 1992), Finnish football goalkeeper

Finnish-language surnames